Tashelan (Tashalan) is a rural locality (a selo) in Zaigrayevsky District, Republic of Buryatia, Russia. The population was 653 as of 2010. There are 7 streets.

Geography 
Tashelan is located 51 km southeast of Zaigrayevo (the district's administrative centre) by road. Mukhor-Tala is the nearest rural locality.

References 

Rural localities in Zaigrayevsky District